NCAA Season 95 is the 2019–20 collegiate athletic year of the National Collegiate Athletic Association of the Philippines. It is hosted by Arellano University. No overall championship title was awarded for this season due to the COVID-19 pandemic in the Philippines.

Calendar
The customary opening basketball game between the season hosts and the defending champions is changed to the second game. Instead, 2019 third placers Letran and runners-up Lyceum will play in the opening game on July 7 at the Mall of Asia Arena, with Arellano and San Beda playing in the main game of the doubleheader.

Second semester sports will be rescheduled to give way to the country's hosting of the 2019 Southeast Asian Games. Women's lawn tennis will be elevated as a regular sport, and a tournament for hado will be held, with the winner going to Japan representing the NCAA.

Several sports events were cancelled due to the impact of the COVID-19 pandemic in the Philippines. No overall championship title will be awarded.

Basketball

Seniors' tournament

Elimination round

Playoffs

Juniors' tournament

Elimination round

Playoffs

Volleyball
All volleyball tournaments were canceled due to the COVID-19 pandemic.

Men's tournament

Elimination round

Women's tournament

Elimination round

Boys' tournament

Elimination round

Girls' tournament

Elimination round

References

See also
UAAP Season 82

2019 in multi-sport events
2020 in Philippine sport
National Collegiate Athletic Association (Philippines) seasons
Sports events curtailed due to the COVID-19 pandemic